The 78th United States Congress was a meeting of the legislative branch of the United States federal government, composed of the United States Senate and the United States House of Representatives. It met in Washington, D.C., from January 3, 1943, to January 3, 1945, during the last two years of Franklin D. Roosevelt's presidency.  The apportionment of seats in the House of Representatives was based on the 1940 United States census.

Both chambers had a Democratic majority - albeit greatly reduced from the 77th Congress, with the Democrats losing their supermajority in the House and Senate.  Along with President Franklin D. Roosevelt, the Democrats maintained an overall federal government trifecta.

Major events

 World War II continued (1941–1945)
 June 6, 1944: Battle of Normandy
 November 7, 1944: General elections:
 President Roosevelt was re-elected to a fourth term.
 Senate Democrats kept their majority despite 1-seat net loss.
 House Democrats increased their majority with a 20-seat net gain.

Major legislation

 December 17, 1943: Magnuson Act (Chinese Exclusion Repeal Act of 1943), Sess. 1, ch. 344, 
 February 3, 1944: Mustering-out Payment Act, Sess. 2, 
 June 6, 1944: Servicemen's Readjustment Act of 1944 (G.I. Bill), Sess. 2, ch. 268, 
 June 27, 1944: Veterans' Preference Act, Sess. 2, ch. 287, 
 July 1, 1944: Public Health Service Act, Sess. 2, ch. 373, 
 December 22, 1944: Pick-Sloan Flood Control Act, Sess. 2, ch. 665,

Party summary

Senate

House of Representatives

Leaders

Senate
 President: Henry A. Wallace (D)
 President pro tempore: Carter Glass (D)

Majority (Democratic) leadership
 Majority Leader: Alben W. Barkley
 Majority Whip: J. Lister Hill
 Democratic Caucus Secretary: Francis T. Maloney

Minority (Republican) leadership
 Minority Leader: Charles L. McNary, until February 25, 1944
 Wallace H. White Jr., after February 25, 1944
 Minority whip: No Republican whips were appointed from 1935 to 1944 since only 17 Republicans were in the Senate following the landslide reelection of President Franklin D. Roosevelt in 1936. Accordingly, the minutes of the Republican Conference for the period state: "On motion of Senator Hastings, duly seconded and carried, it was agreed that no Assistant Leader or Whip be elected but that the chairman be authorized to appoint Senators from time to time to assist him in taking charge of the interests of the minority." A note attached to the conference minutes added: "The chairman of the conference, Senator McNary, apparently appointed Senator Austin of Vermont as assistant leader in 1943 and 1944, until the conference adopted Rules of Organization."
 Republican Conference Secretary:  Wallace H. White Jr., until February 25, 1944
 Harold Hitz Burton (from February 25, 1944)
 National Senatorial Committee Chair: John G. Townsend Jr.

House of Representatives
 Speaker: Sam Rayburn (D)

Majority (Democratic) leadership
 Majority Leader: John W. McCormack
 Majority whip: Robert Ramspeck
 Democratic Caucus Chairman: Harry R. Sheppard
 Democratic Campaign Committee Chairman: Patrick H. Drewry

Minority (Republican) leadership
 Minority Leader: Joseph W. Martin Jr.
 Minority whip: Harry Lane Englebright, until May 13, 1943
 Leslie C. Arends, from May 13, 1943
 Republican Conference Chairman: Roy O. Woodruff
 Republican Campaign Committee Chairman: Charles A. Halleck

Members

Senate
Senators are popularly elected statewide every two years, with one-third beginning new six-year terms with each Congress.  Preceding the names in the list below are Senate class numbers, which indicate the cycle of their election, In this Congress, Class 3 meant their term ended with this Congress, facing re-election in 1944; Class 1 meant their term began in the last Congress, facing re-election in 1946; and Class 2 meant their term began in this Congress, facing re-election in 1948.

Alabama 
 2. John H. Bankhead II (D)
 3. J. Lister Hill (D)

Arizona 
 1. Ernest McFarland (D)
 3. Carl Hayden (D)

Arkansas 
 2. John L. McClellan (D)
 3. Hattie Wyatt Caraway (D)

California 
 1. Hiram Johnson (R)
 3. Sheridan Downey (D)

Colorado 
 2. Edwin C. Johnson (D)
 3. Eugene Millikin (R)

Connecticut 
 1. Francis T. Maloney (D)
 3. John A. Danaher (R)

Delaware 
 1. James M. Tunnell (D)
 2. C. Douglass Buck (R)

Florida 
 1. Charles O. Andrews (D)
 3. Claude Pepper (D)

Georgia 
 2. Richard Russell Jr. (D)
 3. Walter F. George (D)

Idaho 
 2. John W. Thomas (R)
 3. David Worth Clark (D)

Illinois 
 2. Charles W. Brooks (R)
 3. Scott W. Lucas (D)

Indiana 
 1. Raymond E. Willis (R)
 3. Frederick Van Nuys (D), until January 25, 1944
 Samuel D. Jackson (D), January 28, 1944 – November 13, 1944
 William E. Jenner (R), from November 14, 1944

Iowa 
 2. George A. Wilson (R)
 3. Guy Gillette (D)

Kansas 
 2. Arthur Capper (R)
 3. Clyde M. Reed (R)

Kentucky 
 2. Happy Chandler (D)
 3. Alben W. Barkley (D)

Louisiana 
 2. Allen J. Ellender (D)
 3. John H. Overton (D)

Maine 
 1. Owen Brewster (R)
 2. Wallace H. White Jr. (R)

Maryland 
 1. George L. P. Radcliffe (D)
 3. Millard Tydings (D)

Massachusetts 
 1. David I. Walsh (D)
 2. Henry Cabot Lodge Jr. (R), until February 3, 1944
 Sinclair Weeks (R), February 8, 1944 – December 19, 1944
 Leverett Saltonstall (R), from December 19, 1944

Michigan 
 1. Arthur Vandenberg (R)
 2. Homer S. Ferguson (R)

Minnesota 
 1. Henrik Shipstead (R)
 2. Joseph H. Ball (R)

Mississippi 
 1. Theodore G. Bilbo (D)
 2. James Eastland (D)

Missouri 
 1. Harry S. Truman (D)
 3. Bennett Champ Clark (D)

Montana 
 1. Burton K. Wheeler (D)
 2. James E. Murray (D)

Nebraska 
 1. Hugh A. Butler (R)
 2. Kenneth S. Wherry (R)

Nevada 
 1. James G. Scrugham (D)
 3. Pat McCarran (D)

New Hampshire 
 2. Styles Bridges (R)
 3. Charles W. Tobey (R)

New Jersey 
 1. William Warren Barbour (R), until November 22, 1943
 Arthur Walsh (D), November 26, 1943 – December 7, 1944
 Howard Alexander Smith (R), from December 7, 1944
 2. Albert W. Hawkes (R)

New Mexico 
 1. Dennis Chávez (D)
 2. Carl Hatch (D)

New York 
 1. James M. Mead (D)
 3. Robert F. Wagner (D)

North Carolina 
 2. Josiah Bailey (D)
 3. Robert Rice Reynolds (D)

North Dakota 
 1. William Langer (R-NPL)
 3. Gerald Nye (R)

Ohio 
 1. Harold Hitz Burton (R)
 3. Robert A. Taft (R)

Oklahoma 
 2. Edward H. Moore (R)
 3. Elmer Thomas (D)

Oregon 
 2. Charles L. McNary (R), until February 25, 1944
 Guy Cordon (R), from March 4, 1944
 3. Rufus C. Holman (R)

Pennsylvania 
 1. Joseph F. Guffey (D)
 3. James J. Davis (R)

Rhode Island 
 1. Peter G. Gerry (D)
 2. Theodore F. Green (D)

South Carolina 
 2. Burnet R. Maybank (D)
 3. Ellison D. Smith (D), until November 17, 1944
 Wilton E. Hall (D), from November 20, 1944

South Dakota 
 2. Harlan J. Bushfield (R)
 3. John Chandler Gurney (R)

Tennessee 
 1. Kenneth McKellar (D)
 2. Tom Stewart (D)

Texas 
 1. Tom Connally (D)
 2. W. Lee O'Daniel (D)

Utah 
 1. Orrice Abram Murdock Jr. (D)
 3. Elbert D. Thomas (D)

Vermont 
 1. Warren Austin (R)
 3. George Aiken (R)

Virginia 
 1. Harry F. Byrd (D)
 2. Carter Glass (D)

Washington 
 1. Monrad Wallgren (D)
 3. Homer Bone (D), until November 13, 1944
 Warren Magnuson (D), from December 14, 1944

West Virginia 
 1. Harley M. Kilgore (D)
 2. Chapman Revercomb (R)

Wisconsin 
 1. Robert M. La Follette Jr. (P)
 3. Alexander Wiley (R)

Wyoming 
 1. Joseph C. O'Mahoney (D)
 2. Edward V. Robertson (R)

House of Representatives
The names of members of the House of Representatives are preceded by their district numbers.

Alabama 
 . Frank W. Boykin (D)
 . George M. Grant (D)
 . Henry B. Steagall (D), until November 22, 1943
 George W. Andrews (D), from March 14, 1944
 . Sam Hobbs (D)
 . Joe Starnes (D)
 . Pete Jarman (D)
 . Carter Manasco (D)
 . John Sparkman (D)
 . John P. Newsome (D)

Arizona 
 . John R. Murdock (D)
 . Richard F. Harless (D)

Arkansas 
 . Ezekiel C. Gathings (D)
 . Wilbur Mills (D)
 . J. William Fulbright (D)
 . William Fadjo Cravens (D)
 . Brooks Hays (D)
 . William F. Norrell (D)
 . Oren Harris (D)

California 
 . Clarence F. Lea (D)
 . Harry Lane Englebright (R), until May 13, 1943
 Clair Engle (D), from August 31, 1943
 . J. Leroy Johnson (R)
 . Thomas Rolph (R)
 . Richard J. Welch (R)
 . Albert E. Carter (R)
 . John H. Tolan (D)
 . Jack Z. Anderson (R)
 . Bertrand W. Gearhart (R)
 . Alfred J. Elliott (D)
 . George E. Outland (D)
 . Jerry Voorhis (D)
 . Norris Poulson (R)
 . Thomas F. Ford (D)
 . John M. Costello (D)
 . Will Rogers Jr. (D), until May 23, 1944
 . Cecil R. King (D)
 . William Ward Johnson (R)
 . Chester E. Holifield (D)
 . John Carl Hinshaw (R)
 . Harry R. Sheppard (D)
 . John R. Phillips (R)
 . Edouard Izac (D)

Colorado 
 . Lawrence Lewis (D), until December 9, 1943
 Dean M. Gillespie (R), from March 7, 1944
 . William S. Hill (R)
 . John Chenoweth (R)
 . Robert F. Rockwell (R)

Connecticut 
 . B. J. Monkiewicz (R)
 . William J. Miller (R)
 . John D. McWilliams (R)
 . Ranulf Compton (R)
 . Clare Boothe Luce (R)
 . Joseph E. Talbot (R)

Delaware 
 . Earle D. Willey (R)

Florida 
 . Robert A. Green (D), until November 25, 1944
 . J. Hardin Peterson (D)
 . Emory H. Price (D)
 . Bob Sikes (D), until October 19, 1944
 . Pat Cannon (D)
 . Joe Hendricks (D)

Georgia 
 . Hugh Peterson (D)
 . Edward E. Cox (D)
 . Stephen Pace (D)
 . Albert Sidney Camp (D)
 . Robert Ramspeck (D)
 . Carl Vinson (D)
 . Malcolm C. Tarver (D)
 . John S. Gibson (D)
 . B. Frank Whelchel (D)
 . Paul Brown (D)

Idaho 
 . Compton I. White (D)
 . Henry Dworshak (R)

Illinois 
 . Stephen A. Day (R)
 . William L. Dawson (D)
 . William A. Rowan (D)
 . Fred E. Busbey (R)
 . Martin Gorski (D)
 . Adolph J. Sabath (D)
 . Thomas J. O'Brien (D)
 . Leonard W. Schuetz (D), until February 13, 1944
 . Thomas S. Gordon (D)
 . Charles S. Dewey (R)
 . Ralph E. Church (R)
 . Chauncey W. Reed (R)
 . Noah M. Mason (R)
 . Leo E. Allen (R)
 . Anton J. Johnson (R)
 . Robert B. Chiperfield (R)
 . Everett Dirksen (R)
 . Leslie C. Arends (R)
 . Jessie Sumner (R)
 . William H. Wheat (R), until January 16, 1944
 Rolla C. McMillen (R), from June 13, 1944
 . Sid Simpson (R)
 . George Evan Howell (R)
 . Calvin D. Johnson (R)
 . Charles W. Vursell (R)
 . James V. Heidinger (R)
 . C. W. Bishop (R)

Indiana 
 . Ray Madden (D)
 . Charles A. Halleck (R)
 . Robert A. Grant (R)
 . George W. Gillie (R)
 . Forest Harness (R)
 . Noble J. Johnson (R)
 . Gerald W. Landis (R)
 . Charles M. La Follette (R)
 . Earl Wilson (R)
 . Raymond S. Springer (R)
 . Louis Ludlow (D)

Iowa 
 . Thomas E. Martin (R)
 . Henry O. Talle (R)
 . John W. Gwynne (R)
 . Karl M. LeCompte (R)
 . Paul Cunningham (R)
 . Fred C. Gilchrist (R)
 . Ben F. Jensen (R)
 . Charles B. Hoeven (R)

Kansas 
 . William P. Lambertson (R)
 . Ulysses Samuel Guyer (R), until June 5, 1943
 Errett P. Scrivner (R), from September 14, 1943
 . Thomas Daniel Winter (R)
 . Edward Herbert Rees (R)
 . Clifford R. Hope (R)
 . Frank Carlson (R)

Kentucky 
 . Noble Jones Gregory (D)
 . Beverly M. Vincent (D)
 . Emmet O'Neal (D)
 . Edward W. Creal (D), until October 13, 1943
 Chester O. Carrier (R), from November 30, 1943
 . Brent Spence (D)
 . Virgil Chapman (D)
 . Andrew J. May (D)
 . Joe B. Bates (D)
 . John M. Robsion (R)

Louisiana 
 . F. Edward Hébert (D)
 . Paul H. Maloney (D)
 . James R. Domengeaux (D), until April 15, 1944
 . James R. Domengeaux (D), from November 7, 1944
 . Overton Brooks (D)
 . Charles E. McKenzie (D)
 . James H. Morrison (D)
 . Henry D. Larcade Jr. (D)
 . A. Leonard Allen (D)

Maine 
 . Robert Hale (R)
 . Margaret Chase Smith (R)
 . Frank Fellows (R)

Maryland 
 . David Jenkins Ward (D)
 . Harry Streett Baldwin (D)
 . Thomas D'Alesandro Jr. (D)
 . Daniel Ellison (R)
 . Lansdale Ghiselin Sasscer (D)
 . James Glenn Beall (R)

Massachusetts 
 . Allen T. Treadway (R)
 . Charles R. Clason (R)
 . Philip J. Philbin (D)
 . Pehr G. Holmes (R)
 . Edith Nourse Rogers (R)
 . George J. Bates (R)
 . Thomas J. Lane (D)
 . Angier Goodwin (R)
 . Charles L. Gifford (R)
 . Christian Herter (R)
 . James Michael Curley (D)
 . John W. McCormack (D)
 . Richard B. Wigglesworth (R)
 . Joseph W. Martin Jr. (R)

Michigan 
 . George G. Sadowski (D)
 . Earl C. Michener (R)
 . Paul W. Shafer (R)
 . Clare Hoffman (R)
 . Bartel J. Jonkman (R)
 . William W. Blackney (R)
 . Jesse P. Wolcott (R)
 . Fred L. Crawford (R)
 . Albert J. Engel (R)
 . Roy O. Woodruff (R)
 . Fred Bradley (R)
 . John B. Bennett (R)
 . George D. O'Brien (D)
 . Louis C. Rabaut (D)
 . John Dingell Sr. (D)
 . John Lesinski Sr. (D)
 . George Anthony Dondero (R)

Minnesota 
 . August H. Andresen (R)
 . Joseph P. O'Hara (R)
 . Richard Pillsbury Gale (R)
 . Melvin Maas (R)
 . Walter Judd (R)
 . Harold Knutson (R)
 . Herman Carl Andersen (R)
 . William Alvin Pittenger (R)
 . Harold Hagen (FL), changed to (R) on April 15, 1944

Mississippi 
 . John E. Rankin (D)
 . Jamie Whitten (D)
 . William Madison Whittington (D)
 . Thomas Abernethy (D)
 . W. Arthur Winstead (D)
 . William M. Colmer (D)
 . Dan R. McGehee (D)

Missouri 
 . Samuel W. Arnold (R)
 . Max Schwabe (R)
 . William Clay Cole (R)
 . C. Jasper Bell (D)
 . Roger C. Slaughter (D)
 . Marion T. Bennett (R), from January 12, 1943
 . Dewey Jackson Short (R)
 . William P. Elmer (R)
 . Clarence Cannon (D)
 . Orville Zimmerman (D)
 . Louis E. Miller (R)
 . Walter C. Ploeser (R)
 . John J. Cochran (D)

Montana 
 . Mike Mansfield (D)
 . James F. O'Connor (D)

Nebraska 
 . Carl Curtis (R)
 . Howard Buffett (R)
 . Karl Stefan (R)
 . Arthur L. Miller (R)

Nevada 
 . Maurice J. Sullivan (D)

New Hampshire 
 . Chester Earl Merrow (R)
 . Foster Waterman Stearns (R)

New Jersey 
 . Charles A. Wolverton (R)
 . Elmer H. Wene (D)
 . James C. Auchincloss (R)
 . D. Lane Powers (R)
 . Charles Aubrey Eaton (R)
 . Donald H. McLean (R)
 . J. Parnell Thomas (R)
 . Gordon Canfield (R)
 . Harry Lancaster Towe (R)
 . Fred A. Hartley Jr. (R)
 . Frank Sundstrom (R)
 . Robert Kean (R)
 . Mary Teresa Norton (D)
 . Edward J. Hart (D)

New Mexico 
 . Clinton Anderson (D)
 . Antonio M. Fernández (D)

New York 
 . Matthew J. Merritt (D)
 . Winifred C. Stanley (R)
 . Leonard W. Hall (R)
 . William Bernard Barry (D)
 . Joseph L. Pfeifer (D)
 . Thomas H. Cullen (D), until March 1, 1944
 John J. Rooney (D), from June 6, 1944
 . James J. Heffernan (D)
 . Andrew Lawrence Somers (D)
 . John J. Delaney (D)
 . Donald Lawrence O'Toole (D)
 . Eugene James Keogh (D)
 . Emanuel Celler (D)
 . James A. O'Leary (D), until March 16, 1944
 Ellsworth B. Buck (R), from June 6, 1944
 . Samuel Dickstein (D)
 . Louis Capozzoli (D)
 . Arthur George Klein (D)
 . Thomas F. Burchill (D)
 . James H. Fay (D)
 . Joseph C. Baldwin (R)
 . Martin J. Kennedy (D)
 . Sol Bloom (D)
 . Vito Marcantonio (AL)
 . Joseph A. Gavagan (D), until December 30, 1943
 James H. Torrens (D), from February 29, 1944
 . Walter A. Lynch (D)
 . Charles A. Buckley (D)
 . James M. Fitzpatrick (D)
 . Ralph A. Gamble (R)
 . Hamilton Fish III (R)
 . Jay Le Fevre (R)
 . William T. Byrne (D)
 . Dean P. Taylor (R)
 . Bernard W. Kearney (R)
 . Clarence E. Kilburn (R)
 . Francis D. Culkin (R), until August 4, 1943
 Hadwen C. Fuller (R), from November 2, 1943
 . Fred J. Douglas (R)
 . Edwin Arthur Hall (R)
 . Clarence E. Hancock (R)
 . John Taber (R)
 . W. Sterling Cole (R)
 . Joseph J. O'Brien (R)
 . James Wolcott Wadsworth Jr. (R)
 . Walter G. Andrews (R)
 . Joseph Mruk (R)
 . John Cornelius Butler (R)
 . Daniel A. Reed (R)

North Carolina 
 . Herbert Covington Bonner (D)
 . John H. Kerr (D)
 . Graham Arthur Barden (D)
 . Harold D. Cooley (D)
 . John Hamlin Folger (D)
 . Carl T. Durham (D)
 . J. Bayard Clark (D)
 . William O. Burgin (D)
 . Robert L. Doughton (D)
 . Cameron A. Morrison (D)
 . Alfred L. Bulwinkle (D)
 . Zebulon Weaver (D)

North Dakota 
 . William Lemke (R-NPL)
 . Usher L. Burdick (R-NPL)

Ohio 
 . George H. Bender (R)
 . Charles H. Elston (R)
 . William E. Hess (R)
 . Harry P. Jeffrey (R)
 . Robert Franklin Jones (R)
 . Cliff Clevenger (R)
 . Edward Oscar McCowen (R)
 . Clarence J. Brown (R)
 . Frederick Cleveland Smith (R)
 . Homer A. Ramey (R)
 . Thomas A. Jenkins (R)
 . Walter E. Brehm (R)
 . John Martin Vorys (R)
 . Alvin F. Weichel (R)
 . Edmund Rowe (R)
 . Percy W. Griffiths (R)
 . Henderson H. Carson (R)
 . J. Harry McGregor (R)
 . Earl Ramage Lewis (R)
 . Michael J. Kirwan (D)
 . Michael A. Feighan (D)
 . Robert Crosser (D)
 . Frances P. Bolton (R)

Oklahoma 
 . Wesley E. Disney (D)
 . John Conover Nichols (D), until July 3, 1943
 William G. Stigler (D), from March 28, 1944
 . Paul Stewart (D)
 . Lyle Boren (D)
 . Mike Monroney (D)
 . Jed Johnson (D)
 . Victor Wickersham (D)
 . Ross Rizley (R)

Oregon 
 . James W. Mott (R)
 . Lowell Stockman (R)
 . Homer D. Angell (R)
 . Harris Ellsworth (R)

Pennsylvania 
 . William I. Troutman (R), until January 2, 1945
 . James A. Gallagher (R)
 . James P. McGranery (D), until November 17, 1943
 Joseph Marmaduke Pratt (R), from January 18, 1944
 . Michael J. Bradley (D)
 . John E. Sheridan (D)
 . C. Frederick Pracht (R)
 . Francis J. Myers (D)
 . Hugh Scott (R)
 . James Wolfenden (R)
 . Charles L. Gerlach (R)
 . J. Roland Kinzer (R)
 . John W. Murphy (D)
 . Thomas B. Miller (R)
 . Ivor D. Fenton (R)
 . Daniel K. Hoch (D)
 . Wilson D. Gillette (R)
 . Thomas E. Scanlon (D)
 . J. William Ditter (R), until November 21, 1943
 . Richard M. Simpson (R)
 . John C. Kunkel (R)
 . Leon H. Gavin (R)
 . Francis E. Walter (D)
 . Chester H. Gross (R)
 . James E. Van Zandt (R), until September 24, 1943
 D. Emmert Brumbaugh (R), from November 2, 1943
 . J. Buell Snyder (D)
 . Grant Furlong (D)
 . Louis E. Graham (R)
 . Harve Tibbott (R)
 . Augustine B. Kelley (D)
 . Robert L. Rodgers (R)
 . Samuel A. Weiss (D)
 . Herman P. Eberharter (D)
 . James A. Wright (D)

Rhode Island 
 . Aime Forand (D)
 . John E. Fogarty (D), until December 7, 1944

South Carolina 
 . L. Mendel Rivers (D)
 . Hampton P. Fulmer (D), until October 19, 1944
 Willa L. Fulmer (D), from November 7, 1944
 . Butler B. Hare (D)
 . Joseph R. Bryson (D)
 . James P. Richards (D)
 . John L. McMillan (D)

South Dakota 
 . Karl E. Mundt (R)
 . Francis H. Case (R)

Tennessee 
 . B. Carroll Reece (R)
 . John Jennings (R)
 . Estes Kefauver (D)
 . Albert Gore Sr. (D), until December 4, 1944
 . Jim Nance McCord (D)
 . Percy Priest (D)
 . W. Wirt Courtney (D)
 . Tom J. Murray (D)
 . Jere Cooper (D)
 . Clifford Davis (D)

Texas 
 . Wright Patman (D)
 . Martin Dies Jr. (D)
 . Lindley Beckworth (D)
 . Sam Rayburn (D)
 . Hatton W. Sumners (D)
 . Luther Alexander Johnson (D)
 . Nat Patton (D)
 . Albert Thomas (D)
 . Joseph J. Mansfield (D)
 . Lyndon B. Johnson (D)
 . William R. Poage (D)
 . Fritz G. Lanham (D)
 . Ed Gossett (D)
 . Richard M. Kleberg (D)
 . Milton H. West (D)
 . R. Ewing Thomason (D)
 . Sam M. Russell (D)
 . Eugene Worley (D)
 . George H. Mahon (D)
 . Paul J. Kilday (D)
 . O. C. Fisher (D)

Utah 
 . Walter K. Granger (D)
 . J. W. Robinson (D)

Vermont 
 . Charles Albert Plumley (R)

Virginia 
 . S. Otis Bland (D)
 . Winder R. Harris (D), until September 15, 1944
 Ralph Hunter Daughton (D), from November 7, 1944
 . Dave E. Satterfield Jr. (D)
 . Patrick H. Drewry (D)
 . Thomas G. Burch (D)
 . Clifton A. Woodrum (D)
 . Absalom Willis Robertson (D)
 . Howard W. Smith (D)
 . John W. Flannagan Jr. (D)

Washington 
 . Warren Magnuson (D), until December 14, 1944
 . Henry M. Jackson (D)
 . Fred B. Norman (R)
 . Hal Holmes (R)
 . Walt Horan (R)
 . John M. Coffee (D)

West Virginia 
 . A. C. Schiffler (R)
 . Jennings Randolph (D)
 . Edward G. Rohrbough (R)
 . Hubert S. Ellis (R)
 . John Kee (D)
 . Joe L. Smith (D)

Wisconsin 
 . Lawrence H. Smith (R)
 . Harry Sauthoff (P)
 . William H. Stevenson (R)
 . Thaddeus Wasielewski (D)
 . Howard J. McMurray (D)
 . Frank Bateman Keefe (R)
 . Reid F. Murray (R)
 . LaVern Dilweg (D)
 . Merlin Hull (P)
 . Alvin O'Konski (R)

Wyoming 
 . Frank A. Barrett (R)

Non-voting members 
 . Anthony Dimond (D)
 . Joseph Rider Farrington (R)
 . Joaquín Miguel Elizalde (I), until August 9, 1944
 Carlos P. Romulo (Lib.), from August 10, 1944
 . Bolívar Pagán (Socialist)

Changes in membership

Senate

|-
| New Jersey (1)
|  nowrap | William Warren Barbour (R)
| Died November 22, 1943.Successor was appointed until an election.
|  nowrap | Arthur Walsh (D)
| November 26, 1943

|-
| Indiana (3)
|  nowrap | Frederick Van Nuys (D)
| Died January 25, 1944.Successor was appointed until an election.
|  nowrap | Samuel D. Jackson (D)
| January 28, 1944

|-
| Massachusetts (2)
|  nowrap | Henry Cabot Lodge Jr. (R)
| Resigned February 3, 1944, to go on active duty in the US Army.Success was appointed until a special election.
|  nowrap | Sinclair Weeks (R)
| February 8, 1944

|-
| Oregon (2)
|  nowrap | Charles L. McNary (R)
| Died February 25, 1944.Successor was appointed and subsequently won special election
|  nowrap | Guy Cordon (R)
| March 4, 1944

|-
| Washington (3)
|  nowrap | Homer Bone (D)
| Resigned November 13, 1944, to become Judge of the U.S. Court of Appeals for the 9th Circuit.Successor was appointed to finish the term, having just been elected to the next term.
|  nowrap | Warren Magnuson (D)
| December 14, 1944

|-
| Indiana (3)
|  nowrap | Samuel D. Jackson (D)
| Appointee was not a candidate to finish the term.Successor was elected.
|  nowrap | William E. Jenner (R)
| November 7, 1944

|-
| South Carolina (3)
|  nowrap | Ellison D. Smith (D)
| Died November 17, 1944.
|  nowrap | Wilton E. Hall (D)
| November 20, 1944

|-
| New Jersey (1)
|  nowrap | Arthur Walsh (D)
| Appointee was not a candidate to finish the term.Successor was elected.
|  nowrap | Howard Alexander Smith (R)
| December 7, 1944

|-
| Massachusetts (2)
|  nowrap | Sinclair Weeks (R)
| Appointee was not a candidate to finish the term.Successor was elected.Successor chose not to take the seat until the next Congress, but was nevertheless duly elected and qualified.
| Leverett Saltonstall (R)
| January 4, 1945

|}

House of Representatives

|-
| 
| Vacant
| style="font-size:80%" | Rep. Philip A. Bennett died in previous Congress
|  | Marion T. Bennett (R)
| January 12, 1943
|-
| 
|  | Harry L. Englebright (R)
| style="font-size:80%" | Died May 13, 1943
|  | Clair Engle (D)
| August 31, 1943
|-
| 
|  | Ulysses S. Guyer (R)
| style="font-size:80%" | Died June 5, 1943
|  | Errett P. Scrivner (R)
| September 14, 1943
|-
| 
|  | John C. Nichols (D)
| style="font-size:80%" | Resigned July 3, 1943, to become vice-president of Transcontinental and Western Air.
|  | William G. Stigler (D)
| March 28, 1944
|-
| 
|  | Francis D. Culkin (R)
| style="font-size:80%" | Died August 4, 1943
|  | Hadwen C. Fuller (R)
| November 2, 1943
|-
| 
|  | James E. Van Zandt (R)
| style="font-size:80%" | Resigned September 24, 1943, after being called to active duty in the US Armed Forces.
|  | D. Emmert Brumbaugh (R)
| November 2, 1943
|-
| 
|  | Edward W. Creal (D)
| style="font-size:80%" | Died October 13, 1943
|  | Chester O. Carrier (R)
| November 30, 1943
|-
| 
|  | James P. McGranery (D)
| style="font-size:80%" | Resigned November 17, 1943, after being appointed an Assistant Attorney General
|  | Joseph Marmaduke Pratt (R)
| January 18, 1944
|-
| 
|  | J. William Ditter (R)
| style="font-size:80%" | Died November 21, 1943
| colspan=2 | Vacant until the next Congress
|-
| 
|  | Henry B. Steagall (D)
| style="font-size:80%" | Died November 22, 1943
|  | George W. Andrews (D)
| March 14, 1944
|-
| 
|  | Lawrence Lewis (D)
| style="font-size:80%" | Died December 9, 1943
|  | Dean M. Gillespie (R)
| March 7, 1944
|-
| 
|  | Joseph A. Gavagan (D)
| style="font-size:80%" | Resigned December 30, 1943, after being elected a justice of the New York Supreme Court
|  | James H. Torrens (D)
| February 29, 1944
|-
| 
|  | William H. Wheat (R)
| style="font-size:80%" | Died January 16, 1944
|  | Rolla C. McMillen (R)
| June 13, 1944
|-
| 
|  | Leonard W. Schuetz (D)
| style="font-size:80%" | Died February 13, 1944
| colspan=2 | Vacant until the next Congress
|-
| 
|  | Thomas H. Cullen (D)
| style="font-size:80%" | Died March 1, 1944
|  | John J. Rooney (D)
| June 6, 1944
|-
| 
|  | James A. O'Leary (D)
| style="font-size:80%" | Died March 16, 1944
|  | Ellsworth B. Buck (R)
| June 6, 1944
|-
| 
|  | James Domengeaux (D)
| style="font-size:80%" | Resigned April 15, 1944, to join US Armed Forces
|  | James Domengeaux (D)
| Re-elected to fill his own vacancy November 7, 1944
|-
| 
|  | Harold Hagen (FL)
| style="font-size:80%" | Changed parties April 15, 1944, after Minnesota Farmer–Labor and Democratic parties merged to become the Minnesota Democratic–Farmer–Labor Party (DFL)
|  | Harold Hagen (R)
| April 15, 1944
|-
| 
|  | Will Rogers Jr. (D)
| style="font-size:80%" | Resigned May 23, 1944, to enter the US Army
| colspan=2 | Vacant until the next Congress
|- 
| 
| Joaquín Miguel Elizalde
| style="font-size:80%" | Resigned August 9, 1944, to become a member of the war cabinet of President Manuel L. Quezon 
| Carlos P. Romulo
| August 10, 1944
|-
| 
|  | Winder R. Harris (D)
| style="font-size:80%" | Resigned September 15, 1944
|  | Ralph Hunter Daughton (D)
| November 7, 1944
|-
| 
|  | Robert L. F. Sikes (D)
| style="font-size:80%" | Resigned October 19, 1944, to enter the U.S. Army
| colspan=2 | Vacant until the next Congress
|-
| 
|  | Hampton P. Fulmer (D)
| style="font-size:80%" | Died October 19, 1944
|  | Willa L. Fulmer (D)
| November 7, 1944
|-
| 
|  | Robert A. Green (D)
| style="font-size:80%" | Resigned November 25, 1944, to enter the United States Navy
| colspan=2 | Vacant until the next Congress
|-
| 
|  | Albert Gore Sr. (D)
| style="font-size:80%" | Resigned December 4, 1944, to enter the United States Army
| colspan=2 | Vacant until the next Congress
|-
| 
|  | John E. Fogarty (D)
| style="font-size:80%" | Resigned December 7, 1944, to enter the United States Navy
| colspan=2 | Vacant until the next Congress
|-
| 
|  | Warren Magnuson (D)
| style="font-size:80%" | Resigned December 14, 1944, when appointed U.S. Senator
| colspan=2 | Vacant until the next Congress
|-
| 
|  | William I. Troutman (R)
| style="font-size:80%" | Resigned January 2, 1945
| colspan=2 | Vacant until the next Congress
|}

Committees

Senate

 Agriculture and Forestry (Chairman: Ellison D. Smith; Ranking Member: Charles L. McNary then Arthur Capper)
 Appropriations (Chairman: Carter Glass; Ranking Member: Gerald P. Nye)
 Audit and Control the Contingent Expenses of the Senate (Chairman: Scott W. Lucas; Ranking Member: Charles W. Tobey)
 Banking and Currency (Chairman: Robert F. Wagner; Ranking Member: Charles W. Tobey)
 Campaign Expenditures Investigation, 1944 (Special) (Chairman: Theodore F. Green)
 Centralization of Heavy Industry in the United States (Select)
 Civil Service (Chairman: Sheridan Downey; Ranking Member: William Langer)
 Civil Service Laws (Special)
 Claims (Chairman: Allen J. Ellender; Ranking Member: Arthur Capper)
 Commerce (Chairman: Josiah W. Bailey; Ranking Member: Charles L. McNary)
 District of Columbia (Chairman: Pat McCarran; Ranking Member: Arthur Capper)
 Education and Labor (Chairman: Elbert D. Thomas; Ranking Member: Robert M. La Follette Jr.)
 Wartime Health and Education
 Enrolled Bills (Chairman: Hattie W. Caraway; Ranking Member: Clyde M. Reed)
 Expenditures in Executive Departments (Chairman: J. Lister Hill; Ranking Member: James J. Davis)
 Finance (Chairman: Walter F. George; Ranking Member: Robert M. La Follette Jr.)
 Foreign Relations (Chairman: Tom Connally; Ranking Member: Hiram W. Johnson)
 Fuel Situation in the Middle West (Special)
 Gasoline and Fuel Oil Shortages (Special)
 Immigration (Chairman: Richard B. Russell; Ranking Member: Hiram W. Johnson)
 Indian Affairs (Chairman: Elmer Thomas; Ranking Member: Robert M. La Follette Jr.)
 Interoceanic Canals (Chairman: Bennett Champ Clark; Ranking Member: Henry Cabot Lodge Jr.)
 Interstate Commerce (Chairman: Burton K. Wheeler; Ranking Member: Wallace H. White Jr.)
 Irrigation and Reclamation (Chairman: John H. Bankhead II; Ranking Member: Charles L. McNary then Hiram W. Johnson)
 Investigate the National Defense Program (Special)
 Judiciary (Chairman: Pat McCarran; Ranking Member: Warren R. Austin)
 Library (Chairman: Alben W. Barkley; Ranking Member: Charles L. McNary then Owen Brewster)
 Manufactures (Chairman: John H. Overton; Ranking Member: Robert M. La Follette Jr.)
 Military Affairs (Chairman: Robert R. Reynolds; Ranking Member: Warren R. Austin)
 Mines and Mining (Chairman: Joseph F. Guffey; Ranking Member: James J. Davis)
 Naval Affairs (Chairman: David I. Walsh; Ranking Member: James J. Davis)
 Patents (Chairman: Homer T. Bone; Ranking Member: Wallace H. White)
 Pensions (Chairman: James M. Tunnell; Ranking Member: Henrik Shipstead)
 Petroleum Resources (Special)
 Post Office and Post Roads (Chairman: Kenneth McKellar; Ranking Member: James J. Davis)
 Post-War Economic Policy and Planning (Special) (Chairman: Walter F. George)
 Printing (Chairman: Carl Hayden; Ranking Member: William Langer)
 Privileges and Elections (Chairman: Theodore F. Green; Ranking Member: Warren R. Austin)
 Public Buildings and Grounds (Chairman: Francis Maloney; Ranking Member: W. Warren Barbour)
 Public Lands and Surveys (Chairman: Carl A. Hatch; Ranking Member: Gerald P. Nye)
 Rules (Chairman: Harry F. Byrd; Ranking Member: Arthur H. Vandenberg)
 Senatorial Campaign Expenditures (Special) (Chairman: Ernest W. McFarland)
 Small Business Enterprises (Special) (Chairman: James E. Murray)
 Territories and Insular Affairs (Chairman: Millard E. Tydings; Ranking Member: Gerald P. Nye)
 Whole
 Wildlife Resources (Special) (Chairman: Bennett Champ Clark)
 Wool Production (Special) (Chairman: Joseph C. O'Mahoney)

House of Representatives

 Accounts (Chairman: John J. Cochran; Ranking Member: James Wolfenden)
 Agriculture (Chairman: Hampton P. Fulmer; Ranking Member: Clifford R. Hope)
 Appropriations (Chairman: Clarence Cannon; Ranking Member: John Taber)
 Banking and Currency (Chairman: Brent Spence; Ranking Member: Jesse P. Wolcott)
 Census (Chairman: A. Leonard Allen; Ranking Member: J. Roland Kinzer)
 Civil Service (Chairman: Robert Ramspeck; Ranking Member: Edith Nourse Rogers)
 Claims (Chairman: Dan R. McGehee; Ranking Member: J. Parnell Thomas)
 Coinage, Weights and Measures (Chairman: Andrew Somers; Ranking Member: Chauncey W. Reed)
 Conservation of Wildlife Resources (Select) (Chairman: A. Willis Robertson)
 Disposition of Executive Papers (Chairman: Alfred J. Elliott; Ranking Member: Bertrand W. Gearhart)
 District of Columbia (Chairman: Jennings Randolph; Ranking Member: Everett M. Dirksen)
 Education (Chairman: Graham A. Barden; Ranking Member: George A. Dondero)
 Election of the President, Vice President and Representatives in Congress (Chairman: Eugene Worley; Ranking Member: Ralph A. Gamble)
 Elections No.#1 (Chairman: C. Jasper Bell; Ranking Member: Clarence E. Hancock)
 Elections No.#2 (Chairman: Ed Gossett; Ranking Member: Francis D. Culkin then Stephen A. Day)
 Elections No.#3 (Chairman: Hugh Peterson; Ranking Member: Charles A. Plumley)
 Enrolled Bills (Chairman: Arthur G. Klein; Ranking Member: Charles Aubrey Eaton)
 Expenditures in the Executive Departments (Chairman: Carter Manasco; Ranking Member: Charles L. Gifford)
 Flood Control (Chairman: William M. Whittington; Ranking Member: Harry Lane Englebright then Charles R. Clason)
 Foreign Affairs (Chairman: Sol Bloom; Ranking Member: Charles Aubrey Eaton)
 Immigration and Naturalization (Chairman: Samuel Dickstein; Ranking Member: Noah M. Mason)
 Indian Affairs (Chairman: James F. O'Connor; Ranking Member: Fred C. Gilchrist)
 Insular Affairs (Chairman: C. Jasper Bell; Ranking Member: Richard J. Welch)
 Interstate and Foreign Commerce (Chairman: Clarence F. Lea; Ranking Member: Charles A. Wolverton)
 Labor (Chairman: Mary Teresa Norton; Ranking Member: Richard J. Welch)
 Memorials (Chairman: John R. Murdock; Ranking Member: Allen T. Treadway)
 Merchant Marine and Fisheries (Chairman: S. Otis Bland; Ranking Member: Richard J. Welch)
 Military Affairs (Chairman: Andrew J. May; Ranking Member: Walter G. Andrews)
 Invalid Pensions (Chairman: John Lesinski; Ranking Member: Robert A. Grant)
 Investigate Acts of Executive Agencies Beyond their Scope of Authority (Select) (Chairman: N/A)
 Investigate the Federal Communications Commission (Select) (Chairman: Edward E. Cox)
 Irrigation and Reclamation (Chairman: Compton I. White; Ranking Member: Dewey Jackson Short)
 Judiciary (Chairman: Hatton W. Sumners; Ranking Member: Ulysses S. Guyer then Clarence E. Hancock)fairs]] (Chairman: Andrew J. May; Ranking Member: Walter G. Andrews)
 Mines and Mining (Chairman: Joe L. Smith; Ranking Member: Harry Lane Englebright then John M. Robsion) 
 Investigate the Seizure of Montgomery Ward and Company (Select) (Chairman: N/A)
 Naval Affairs (Chairman: Carl Vinson; Ranking Member: Melvin J. Maas)
 Patents (Chairman: Frank W. Boykin; Ranking Member: Fred A. Hartley Jr.)
 Pensions (Chairman: Charles A. Buckley; Ranking Member: Fred J. Douglas)
 Post Office and Post Roads (Chairman: Thomas G. Burch; Ranking Member: Fred A. Hartley Jr.)
 Post-War Military Policy (Select) (Chairman: Clifton A. Woodrum)
 Post-War Economic Policy and Planning (Special) (Chairman: N/A; Ranking Member: N/A)
 Printing (Chairman: Pete Jarman; Ranking Member: N/A)
 Public Buildings and Grounds (Chairman: Fritz G. Lanham; Ranking Member: Pehr G. Holmes)
 Public Lands (Chairman: J. Hardin Peterson; Ranking Member: Harry Lane Englebright)
 Revision of Laws (Chairman: Eugene J. Keogh; Ranking Member: Earl C. Michener)
 Rivers and Harbors (Chairman: Joseph J. Mansfield; Ranking Member: Albert E. Carter)
 Roads (Chairman: J.W. Robinson; Ranking Member: Jesse P. Wolcott)
 Rules (Chairman: Adolph J. Sabath; Ranking Member: Hamilton Fish III)
 Small Business (Select) (Chairman: Wright Patman; Ranking Member: Usher L. Burdick)
 Standards of Official Conduct
 Territories (Chairman: Robert A. Green; Ranking Member: Usher L. Burdick)
 War Claims (Chairman: Edward J. Hart; Ranking Member: Clare E. Hoffman)
 Ways and Means (Chairman: Robert L. Doughton; Ranking Member: Allen T. Treadway)
 World War Veterans' Legislation (Chairman: John E. Rankin; Ranking Member: Edith Nourse Rogers)
 Whole

Joint committees

 Commemorate the Centennial of the Telegraph
 Conditions of Indian Tribes (Special)
 Disposition of (Useless) Executive Papers
 The Library (Chairman: Sen. Alben W. Barkley)
 Reduction of Nonessential Federal Expenditures (Chairman: Sen. Harry F. Byrd; Vice Chairman: Rep. Robert L. Doughton)
 Organization of Congress 
 Printing (Chairman: Sen. Carl Hayden; Vice Chairman: Rep. Pete Jarman)
 Selective Service Deferments 
 Taxation (Chairman: Sen. Walter F. George; Vice Chairman: Rep. Robert L. Doughton)

Caucuses
 Democratic (House)
 Democratic (Senate)

Employees

Legislative branch agency directors
 Architect of the Capitol: David Lynn
 Attending Physician of the United States Congress: George Calver
 Comptroller General of the United States: Lindsay C. Warren
 Librarian of Congress: Archibald MacLeish, until 1944
 Public Printer of the United States: Augustus E. Giegengack

Senate
 Chaplain: Frederick Brown Harris (Methodist)
 Parliamentarian: Charles Watkins
 Secretary: Edwin A. Halsey
 Librarian: Ruskin McArdle
 Secretary for the Majority: Leslie Biffle 
 Secretary for the Minority: Carl A. Loeffler
 Sergeant at Arms: Chesley W. Jurney, until January 31, 1943 
 Wall Doxey, from February 1, 1943

House of Representatives
 Chaplain: James Shera Montgomery (Methodist)
 Clerk: South Trimble
 Doorkeeper: Joseph J. Sinnott, until January 27, 1943 
 Ralph R. Roberts, from February 5, 1943
 Parliamentarian: Lewis Deschler
 Postmaster: Finis E. Scott
 Reading Clerks: George J. Maurer (D) and Alney E. Chaffee (R)
 Sergeant at Arms: Kenneth Romney

See also 
 1942 United States elections (elections leading to this Congress)
 1942 United States Senate elections
 1942 United States House of Representatives elections
 1944 United States elections (elections during this Congress, leading to the next Congress)
 1944 United States presidential election
 1944 United States Senate elections
 1944 United States House of Representatives elections

Notes

References